Carmen Papalia (born 1981) is a blind artist from Vancouver, British Columbia. His practice focuses on "creative wayfinding", the use of alternative modes of navigation without visual cues. Papalia is known for his performances. This includes a performance in Santa Ana, California where Papalia was guided only by a marching band playing predetermined audio cues for physical obstacles and navigation. Papalia also conducts non-visual walking tours for sighted people. His ongoing Open Access project works towards guidelines for engagement with diverse audiences.

Education
Papalia holds a Bachelor of Fine Arts from Simon Fraser University in Vancouver and a Master of Fine Arts from Portland State University.

Career
Papalia has exhibited at the Whitney Museum, Craft Contemporary, the Grand Central Art Center, the Cantor Fitzgerald Gallery at Haverford College, the Portland Art Museum, the Columbus Museum of Art, the Vancouver Art Gallery and the Museum of Modern Art in New York.

He has been artist in residence at the Victoria and Albert Museum in London, and the Model Contemporary Arts Centre in Ireland.

References

1981 births
Living people
21st-century Canadian artists
Canadian blind people
Simon Fraser University alumni
Portland State University alumni
Artists from Vancouver
Canadian performance artists